Independent Entertainment is a record label that is owned and founded by Nigerian R&B singer Faze. Other than Faze, there are yet no other signed artiste to the record label though. Faze showed interest in adding to the number signed artistes to the label as soon as his third studio album plies the way of success like his previous albums.

Artists
Faze

Discography

Albums
Faze - Independent 
Released: October 5, 2006   
Album sales: 3× Platinum
Singles: "Kolomental", "Kpo Kpo di Kpo", "Tattoo Girls", "Loving You Everyday", "Letter to my Brother", "Need Somebody"

Faze - Originality   
Released: October 6, 2008    
Album sales (as at October 15): Platinum
Singles: "Originality", "Spend my money", "I'm in love", "Dutty Wine", "Valentine's Day", "Yawa Eh","Hold Your", "Play Ball"

Video releases
Faze - Kolomental Video   
Released: September 2007    
Album sales: Platinum
Singles: "Kolomental", "Kpo Kpo di Kpo", "Tatoo Girls", "Loving You Everyday", "Letter to My Brother", "Need Somebody"

Future releases
Faze - Independent ReelMix 
Released:    
Album Sales: 
Singles: "Psykolomental Remix", "Kpo Kpo di Kpo Remix", "Tatoo Girls Remix",

References

Nigerian independent record labels
Record labels established in 2006
Contemporary R&B record labels
Hip hop record labels